Yong Jing (born 9 January 1994) is a Chinese field hockey player for the Chinese national team.

She participated at the 2018 Women's Hockey World Cup.

References

External links

1994 births
Living people
Chinese female field hockey players